In electrochemistry, partial current is defined as the electric current associated with (anodic or cathodic) half of the electrode reaction.

Depending on the electrode half-reaction, one can distinguish two types of partial current:
 cathodic partial current Ic (called also cathodic current): is the flow of electrons from the electrode surface to a species in solution;
 anodic partial current Ia (called also anodic current): is the flow of electrons into the electrode from a species in solution.

The cathodic and anodic partial currents are defined by IUPAC.

The partial current densities (ic and ia) are the ratios of partial currents respect to the electrode areas (Ac and Aa):

ic = Ic/Ac
ia = Ia/Aa

The sum of the cathodic partial current density ic (positive) and the anodic partial current density ia (negative) gives the net current density i:

i = ic + ia

In the case of the cathodic partial current density being equal to the anodic partial current density (for example, in a corrosion process), the net current density on the electrode is zero:

ieq = ic,eq + ia,eq = 0

When more than one reaction occur on an electrode simultaneously, then the total electrode current can be expressed as:

where the index  refers to the particular reactions.

Notes

References 
 Bard, A.J. and Faulkner L.R. Electrochemical Methods: Fundamentals and Applications (2nd ed.), 2001 John Wiley & Sons Inc.

See also
 Exchange current density

Electrochemistry